William Dale Swann (January 21, 1948 – April 9, 2009) was an American character actor known for his numerous roles in television, film and commercials.

Biography

Early life
Dale Swann was born on January 21, 1948, in Harrisburg, Illinois. After his family had relocated to the St. Louis Metro East area, he graduated from East Alton-Wood River High School, then attended Southern Illinois University Edwardsville, where received his bachelor's degree in fine arts.

Career
Swann relocated to Los Angeles following college, living there for more than thirty years while pursuing his acting career. Performing both  television and films roles, Swann was particularly proud of his role a 1987 television movie called Proud Men, which starred Charlton Heston.  According to family members, Swann received a personal letter from Heston thanking him for his role in the movie following the end of production.

Swann's film roles included Black Day Blue Night, Demon Knight, Drop Zone, We're Talkin' Serious Money, Gremlins 2: The New Batch and Tango and Cash, and he spent three weeks filming on location in Yugoslavia during the production of the 1991 film, Born to Ride, in which Swann appeared opposite John Stamos.

Swann's television credits included parts in Beverly Hills, 90210, Melrose Place, Adam-12, Quantum Leap, Hunter, Baywatch, Beauty and the Beast and L.A. Law.  He also appeared in the miniseries The Alamo: Thirteen Days to Glory and in numerous made-for-television movies, including Everybody's Baby: The Rescue of Jessica McClure, Do You Know the Muffin Man?, Buried Alive, The Court-Martial of Jackie Robinson, Switched at Birth and Willing to Kill: The Texas Cheerleader Story.

To earn income between jobs, Swann worked as a telemarketing representative and in the admitting and billing departments of the UCLA Medical Center.

Later life
Swann returned to his native Alton, Illinois, in 2003, taking a position with Fabrication Specialists of Illinois, a precision custom manufacturer.

He suffered a stroke in February 2009 and died at his home in Alton on April 9, 2009, at the age of 61. He was survived by his sister, Betty Swann, who described her brother as "...a good actor. He loved acting; he really did. He was able to express a lot of his emotions while acting," in an April 2009 interview with The Telegraph of Alton. Swann never married and had no children. "He loved being independent. He loved just one woman his whole life, even though they never got married or had children," his sister told the paper.

Filmography

References

External links

1948 births
2009 deaths
American male film actors
American male television actors
Male actors from Illinois
Southern Illinois University Edwardsville alumni
Male actors from Los Angeles
People from Alton, Illinois
People from Harrisburg, Illinois
20th-century American male actors